Oh Seung-taek (born June 7, 1991), better known by the stage name Lil Boi (stylised as lIlBOI), is a South Korean rapper. He is member of hip-hop duo Geeks. In 2020, he won Show Me the Money 9.

Discography

Studio albums

Singles

Other charted songs

Filmography

Television shows

Awards and nominations

Notes

References

External links
 
 

1991 births
Living people
South Korean male rappers
South Korean hip hop singers
Show Me the Money (South Korean TV series) contestants
21st-century South Korean male singers